NGC 194 is an elliptical galaxy located in the constellation Pisces. It was discovered on December 25, 1790 by William Herschel.

References

External links
 

0194
0407
+00-02-105
Elliptical galaxies
Pisces (constellation)
002362